The Tristan moorhen (Gallinula nesiotis) is an extinct species of flightless rail endemic to the South Atlantic island of Tristan da Cunha. It was very similar to the Gough moorhen of Gough Island, located 395 miles to the southeast.

The once abundant Tristan moorhen had become rare by 1873, and by the end of 19th century it was extinct as a result of hunting, predation by introduced species (rats, cats and pigs) and habitat destruction by fire. A handful of taxidermical specimens of the Tristan moorhen have been preserved, including one at Harvard University.

In 1956 the closely related Gough moorhen G. comeri was introduced to Tristan da Cunha. On the basis of DNA sequencing of both recently collected and historical material from both species,  Groenenberg et al (2008) concluded that the genetic distances between G. nesiotis and G. comeri are of at least the same size as those found between subspecies of G. chloropus in the literature. They propose that the extinct moorhen of Tristan (Gallinula nesiotis) and the moorhens that live on Gough and Tristan today (G. comeri) be regarded as subspecies.

Notes 

Tristan moorhen
Extinct birds of subantarctic islands
Extinct birds of Atlantic islands
†
Bird extinctions since 1500
Tristan moorhen
Tristan moorhen